Southeast Georgia is a nineteen-county region located south of the Altamaha River in the U.S. state of Georgia. The 2010 census calculated the region's population to be at 523,905. The largest city in this region is Valdosta and the largest county is Lowndes County.

Counties
 Camden County - pop. 50,513
 Glynn County - pop. 79,626
 Charlton County - pop. 12,171
 Wayne County - pop. 30,099
 Brantley County - pop. 18,411
 Ware County - pop. 36,312
 Pierce County - pop. 18,758
 Appling County - pop. 18,236
 Bacon County - pop. 11,096
 Clinch County - pop. 6,798
 Echols County - pop. 4,034
 Jeff Davis County - pop. 15,068
 Coffee County - pop. 42,356
 Atkinson County - pop. 8,375
 Lanier County - pop. 10,078
 Lowndes County - pop. 109,233
 Brooks County - pop. 16,243
 Cook County - pop. 17,212
 Berrien County - pop. 19,286

Major cities
 Valdosta - pop. 56,457
 St. Marys - pop. 18,567
 Kingsland - pop. 17,949
 Brunswick - pop. 16,256
 Waycross - pop. 13,480
 St. Simons Island - pop. 12,743
 Douglas - pop. 11,695
 Jesup - pop. 9,841
 Nashville - pop. 7,029
 Adel - pop. 5,507

Regions of Georgia (U.S. state)